The ATS D2 was a Formula One racing car manufactured and raced by the ATS Wheels racing team for most of the 1979 Formula One season. It was powered by a Cosworth DFV V8 engine.  Driven by Hans-Joachim Stuck, the D2 failed to finish any races in the points. It was superseded by the ATS D3 from the Austrian Grand Prix.

Development
The D2 was designed by John Gentry and Giocomo Caliri, the latter of whom had previously worked for Ferrari. Utilising an aluminium monocoque, the D2 was powered by a Cosworth DFV V8.

Racing history
ATS entered the season with a single car entry for German driver Hans-Joachim Stuck.  The D2 was generally unreliable and Stuck finished only two races from the seven that he qualified for (he failed to qualify for the season opening race in Argentina and also the British Grand Prix).  Stuck's best race was in Belgium where he finished 8th, having started 20th on the grid. He usually qualified on the back three rows of the grid but in Monaco he managed to qualify 12th.

From the Austrian Grand Prix, the ATS team switched to a new car, the ATS D3.

Complete Formula One World Championship results
(key) (Results in bold indicate pole position; results in italics indicate fastest lap)

* All points scored with the ATS D3

Notes

References

ATS Formula One cars